MapInfo Interchange Format is a map and database exporting file format of
MapInfo software product. The MIF-file filename usually ends with .mif-suffix.
Some MIF-files also have a related MID-file. The filename of a MID-file usually ends
with .mid-suffix.

See also
MapInfo TAB format

External links
MapInfo Data Interchange Format

GIS file formats